Antonio Capuano (died 1963) was an Argentine actor. He starred in the 1950 film Bólidos de acero under director Carlos Torres Ríos.

Selected filmography
 Santos Vega Returns (1947)
 The Black Market (1953)
 The White Land (1959)

References

External links
 
 

Argentine male film actors
1963 deaths
Year of birth missing